Resultor is a genus of green algae in the family Pedinomonadaceae.

References

Chlorophyta genera
Pedinophyceae